Ruffin & Kendrick is the last album by David Ruffin and Eddie Kendricks, former members and lead singers of The Temptations.

Track listing
"I Couldn't Believe It" (Mike Crump, Renaldo Benson, Ronnie McNeir)
"Ordinary Girl" (David Sandridge, Rahni Song)
"One More for the Lonely Hearts Club" (Charles White, Eddie Kendrick, Marvay Braxton)
"Whatever You Got" (Irwin Levine, Jim Bonnefond, Rick Iantosca)
"Don't Know Why (You're Dreaming)" (Mike Crump, Renaldo Benson, Ronnie McNeir)
"Family Affair" (Sylvester Stewart)
"One Last Kiss" (Irwin Levine, Jim Bonnefond, Rick Iantosca)
"You Only Get What You Put Out" (Gene McFadden, Linda Vitali, Paul Fox)
"Goodnight Pillow" (Charles White, Eddie Kendrick, Marvay Braxton)

Chart history

Singles

References

RCA Records albums
David Ruffin albums
Eddie Kendricks albums